Jimmy Orr (October 4, 1935 – October 27, 2020) was an American professional football player who was a wide receiver for the Pittsburgh Steelers and Baltimore Colts for 13 seasons from 1958 to 1970 in the National Football League (NFL). Orr was a two-time Pro Bowler, as a Steeler in 1959 and as a Colt in 1965. Orr was a popular player during his time in Baltimore and the corner of the end zone in Memorial Stadium where he caught many of his passes was often affectionately referred to as "Orrsville".

Orr played college football at the University of Georgia and was chosen UPI NFL Rookie of the Year in 1958 in a season in which he had 33 receptions for 910 yards and seven touchdowns and also punted. His 910 yards stood as a franchise rookie record until 2017 when it was surpassed by JuJu Smith-Schuster. Orr's three touchdowns and 205 yards in the season finale against the Chicago Cardinals remain Steelers rookie records. He played his first three seasons in Pittsburgh, was traded in a five-player deal in July 1961, and concluded his career with ten seasons in Baltimore.

Orr retired in 1970 with exactly 400 career receptions for 7,914 receiving yards and 66 touchdowns.

Orr is known for his part in a play in Super Bowl III against the New York Jets. On the last play of the first half, Colt quarterback Earl Morrall handed off to Tom Matte, who threw a lateral back to Morrall in a flea-flicker play. Orr was wide open at the 20-yard line with an open lane to the end zone, but Morrall did not see him and threw instead to fullback Jerry Hill, but the ball was intercepted by Jets safety Jim Hudson.

See also
 List of NCAA major college football yearly receiving leaders

References

External links
 

1935 births
2020 deaths
American football wide receivers
Atlanta Falcons announcers
Atlanta Falcons coaches
Baltimore Colts players
Georgia Bulldogs football players
National Football League announcers
Pittsburgh Steelers players
Eastern Conference Pro Bowl players
Western Conference Pro Bowl players
People from Seneca, South Carolina
People from Tuscumbia, Alabama
Players of American football from Alabama
Players of American football from South Carolina
Seneca College alumni